The list of shipwrecks in 1835 includes ships sunk, foundered, wrecked, grounded or otherwise lost during 1835.

January

February

March

April

May

June

July

August

September

October

November

December

Unknown date

References

1835